Spire Christian Comics was a line of comic books published by Fleming H. Revell starting in 1972. 

In the 1980s, Barbour & Company, founded by Hugh Revell Barbour, acquired the rights to republish many of the titles in the Spire Christian Comics line under the New Barbour Christian Comics imprint, keeping the comics in print until 1988.

History 
Christian book publisher Fleming H. Revell had approached Al Hartley, about doing comic book adaptions of Christian-themed books that they were publishing.  Hartley was working for Archie Comics at the time.  In 1972, they launched Spire with two titles, God's Smuggler and The Cross and the Switchblade.

Hartley's connection with Archie comics publisher John Goldwater helped Spire license the Archie characters in a Christian-themed series, and in 1973 they launched the first of 19 Archie titles, Archie's One Way.

Other comics were based on true stories, Christian novels, or Christian movies. Examples of this type include those based on Charles Colson's Born Again, Corrie ten Boom's The Hiding Place, and a modernized version of Charles Sheldon's 1896 novel In His Steps.

A line of comics for very young children featured young Barney Bear, who lived with his parents in a cave in Yellowstone National Park.

The comics were created from 1972 and 1982 and kept in print for several years.

List of titles

Archie series 
 Archie and Big Ethel 
 Archie and Mr. Weatherbee
 Archie Gets a Job 
 Archie's Car 
 Archie's Circus 
 Archie's Clean Slate 
 Archie's Date Book 
 Archie's Family Album 
 Archie's Festival
 Archie's Love Scene 
 Archie's One Way 
 Archie's Parables 
 Archie's Roller Coaster 
 Archie's Something Else! 
 Archie's Sonshine 
 Archie's Sports Scene 
 Archie's World 
 Christmas with Archie 
 Jughead's Soul Food

Bible story adaptations 

 Adam & Eve (modernised story)
 Alpha and Omega (modernised Adam and Eve/Jonah story)
 Jesus (also published as He's the Greatest!)
 Live It Up (also published as The Prodigal Son)
 My Brother's Keeper (modernised story of Joseph)
 Noah's Ark (modernised (somewhat) version of the story because God does destroy everything)
 Paul: Close Encounter of a Real Kind (modernised story of Paul the Apostle)

Biographical and autobiographical 

 Attack! (Mitsuo Fuchida)
 Born Again (Chuck Colson)
 Corrie ten Boom's The Hiding Place
 Crossfire
 The Cross and the Switchblade (David Wilkerson)
 God's Smuggler (Brother Andrew)
 Hansi, the Girl who Loved the Swastika (Maria Anne Hirschmann)
 Hello, I'm Johnny Cash
 In the Presence of Mine Enemies (Howard Rutledge)
 On the Road with Andrae Crouch
 Through Gates of Splendor (Nate Saint and Jim Elliot)
 Tom Landry and the Dallas Cowboys
 Tom Skinner's Up from Harlem

Kiddies Christian Comics 

 Barney Bear: Family Tree 
 Barney Bear: Home Plate! 
 Barney Bear in Toyland 
 Barney Bear: Lost and Found 
 Barney Bear Out of the Woods 
 Barney Bear: Sunday School Picnic 
 Barney Bear: The Swamp Gang 
 Barney Bear Wakes Up!
 God Is...

Other book/movie adaptations 

 Adventure with the Brothers: The Cult Escape 
 Adventure with the Brothers: Smashing the Smugglers' Ring 
 Adventure with the Brothers: Hang in There
 Hal Lindsey's There's A New World Coming 
 In His Steps
 Time to Run
 Joseph T. Bayly's The Gospel Blimp

See also
Jack T. Chick

References

External links
Christian Comics International

Comics magazines published in the United States
Comic book publishing companies of the United States
Defunct comics and manga publishing companies
Christian comics
Archie Comics titles
1972 establishments in the United States
Magazines established in 1972
Magazines disestablished in 1982
1972 comics debuts
1982 comics endings